Jordan Paul Hallam (born 6 October 1998) is an English professional footballer who plays as a midfielder for Ilkeston Town on loan from Scunthorpe United.

Career
Born in Sheffield, Hallam came through the Academy at Sheffield United to make his senior debut for the "Blades" in a 4–2 victory over Grimsby Town in an EFL Trophy match on 9 November 2016.

On 24 February 2018, Hallam attended a trial with Norwegian second tier team Viking. Approximately two weeks later he agreed to go on loan to Viking until the end of June. Viking had the option to sign him permanently after his loan expired, but decided not to do so.

On 23 November 2018, Hallam joined National League side Chesterfield on a one-month loan deal. A day later, he scored on his debut in a 1–1 draw with Eastleigh.

On 25 January 2019, Hallam joined Scunthorpe United on a free transfer.

In February 2023, having recently returned from a long-term injury, Hallam joined Ilkeston Town on an initial one-month loan deal alongside teammate Mason O'Malley.

Career statistics

References

External links

1998 births
Living people
English footballers
Association football midfielders
Sheffield United F.C. players
Southport F.C. players
Viking FK players
Chesterfield F.C. players
Scunthorpe United F.C. players
Ilkeston Town F.C. players
National League (English football) players
Norwegian First Division players
English Football League players
English expatriate footballers
Expatriate footballers in Norway
English expatriate sportspeople in Norway